Gilbert Ernest Nicholls (July 23, 1878 – January 17, 1950) was an English-American professional golfer, prominent in the late 19th and early 20th centuries. He had eight top-10 finishes in the U.S. Open.

Early life
Nicholls was born in Dover, Kent, England on July 23, 1878, to Frank Nicholls (1851–1930) and Lois Elizabeth Cordrey (1855–1935).

Nicholls brothers emigrate to U.S.
After working in Cannes, France, the two Nicholls brothers emigrated to the United States in 1897 and 1898, when golf was growing rapidly in North America. He had an older brother Bernard (also known as Ben), also an excellent competitive golfer, who posted five top-10 finishes in the U.S. Open between 1897 and 1907, although Gilbert eventually compiled the better record of the two.

Bernard Nicholls, then playing out of the Boston area, earned the distinction of twice defeating Harry Vardon, then the top player in the world, head-to-head, on Vardon's 1900 tour of the United States and Canada; those were the only head-to-head matches Vardon lost on that tour.

The first match was on February 17, 1900, at Ormond Beach, Florida, when he soundly defeated the British star 5 and 4; and the second was at the Brae Burn Country Club near Boston on 13 October 1900 when he won 2 up in a 36-hole match.

The Nicholls brothers worked as club professionals and also sold golf clubs under the "Nicholls Brothers" and later "Butchart-Nicholls" brands. Gilbert worked at clubs in Lexington, Massachusetts, St. Louis, Missouri, Denver, Colorado, Wilmington, Delaware, Beaumont, Texas, and finally Great Neck, New York.

Marriage and family
Nicholls married Mary Agnes Gately (1878–1927) on May 14, 1901, in Roxbury, Massachusetts. They had five children, four boys and one girl. When his wife Mary died at the relatively young age of 48, Nicholls remarried to Eleanor "Ella" Catherine Moshier, née Watson (1897–1989) on January 7, 1929, in Miami, Florida. He met Mary Gately when he was lodging with the Lewis Tapley family in 1900 shortly after arriving in the United States.  The Tapley's were Mary Gately's aunt and uncle.

Golf career

Competitive record
Nicholls is officially credited with five PGA Tour victories for his career, along with one third-place finish; he placed 15 times in the top-10 and 24 times in the top-25.

As well, he finished as runner-up in two U.S. Opens, in 1904 and 1907; he had a total of eight U.S. Open finishes in the top-10. He would have had a ninth, a T-5 in 1908, but he was disqualified for signing an incorrect scorecard. Among tournaments Nicholls won are included the 1909 and 1912 Philadelphia Open Championships, the 1911 and 1915 Metropolitan Opens, the 1911 and 1914 North and South Opens, the 1912 Florida Open, and the 1924 Maine Open. He is also listed as having won  PGA Tour events in 1917 and 1921.

Memorable matches
Nicholls teamed twice with the legendary Willie Anderson, a World Golf Hall of Fame member who won four U.S. Opens, in 36-hole exhibition matches shortly before Anderson died in late October 1910. On October 21, Nicholls and Anderson lost to Jock Hutchison and Peter Robertson at a Pittsburgh club. Two days later, Nicholls and Anderson teamed again at the Allegheny Country Club in Sewickley, Pennsylvania, and lost on the final hole to two top-flight amateur players: William C. Fownes (then U.S. Amateur champion) and Eben Byers (1906 Amateur champion). This was Anderson's final match; he tired noticeably as the match progressed and died two days later at his home in Philadelphia at age 31.

In 1913 Vardon again toured North America and, teaming with Ted Ray, barnstormed the continent prior to the U.S. Open. In the first match of the tour, the two Englishmen met the Nicholls brothers in Philadelphia, and defeated them over 18 holes with a medal score of 68.

Golf club shaft patent
On April 26, 1927, Nicholls was awarded United States Patent No. 1,626,476. His invention was intended to improve the construction of wooden golf shafts by laminating different types of wood together; in the case of his invention it was a plurality of bamboo and hickory woods. When steel shafts became available in the early 1930s, Nicholls' invention quickly became obsolete.

Death
Nicholls died on January 17, 1950, in Great Neck, New York.

Tournament wins
Note: This list is incomplete.
1909 Philadelphia Open Championship
1911 Metropolitan Open, Florida Open, North and South Open
1912 Philadelphia Open Championship
1914 North and South Open
1915 Metropolitan Open, Shawnee Open
1921 New England PGA Championship
1922 New England PGA Championship
1924 Maine Open
1927 Florida West Coast Open

Results in major championships

Note: Nicholls never played in the Masters Tournament, founded in 1934.

NYF = Tournament not yet founded
NT = No tournament
DQ = Disqualified
"T" indicates a tie for a place
R64, R32, R16, QF, SF = Round in which player lost in PGA Championship match play

Sources: U.S. Open, Open Championship, PGA Championship

References

English male golfers
American male golfers
PGA Tour golfers
Golf administrators
Golfers from New York (state)
Sportspeople from Dover, Kent
People from Folkestone
English emigrants to the United States
1878 births
1950 deaths